This is a list of the first minority male lawyer(s) and judge(s) in Washington. It includes the year in which the men were admitted to practice law (in parentheses). Also included are men who achieved other distinctions such becoming the first in their state to graduate from law school or become a political figure.

Firsts in Washington's history

Lawyers 

 First African American male: Robert O. Lee (1889) 
 First Korean American male: Eddie Yoon (1976)

Law  Clerk 

 First African American male to clerk for the Washington Supreme Court: Charles Z. Smith (1955)

State judges 

First African American male: John E. Prim (1927) in 1954 
First Jewish American male: Solie M. Ringold in 1961 
First African American male (municipal court): Charles Z. Smith (1955) in 1965
 First Native American (Cherokee) male: James Phillips in 1929  
 First Asian American male (Chinese ancestry): Warren Chan (1950) in 1956 
 First African American male (superior court): Charles Z. Smith (1955) in 1966 
 First African American male (district court): Charles M. Stokes (c. 1943) in 1968 
 First elected Japanese American male: Richard Ishikawa in 1979  
 First African American male (Washington Supreme Court): Charles Z. Smith (1955) from 1988-2002 
 First Asian American male (elected to district court): Mark Chow in 1990
 First Latino American male: Ricardo S. Martinez (1980) in 1990 
 First openly gay male: Tim Bradbury in 1995 
First Latino and Jewish American male (Washington Supreme Court): Steven Gonzalez (1991) in 2012
 First Samoan American male: Fa’amomoi Masaniai in 2021

Federal judges 
First African American male (U.S. District Court for the Eastern District of Washington; U.S. District Court for the Western District of Washington): Jack Edward Tanner (1955) in 1978
First Latino American male (U.S. District Court for the Western District of Washington): Ricardo S. Martinez (1980) in 2004
First Hispanic American male (U.S. District Court for the Eastern District of Washington): Salvador Mendoza Jr. (1997) in 2014
 First Asian American male (of South Korean descent) (United States District Court for the Western District of Washington): John H. Chun in 2022 
 First Hispanic American male (United States Court of Appeals for the Ninth Circuit): Salvador Mendoza Jr. (1997) in 2022

United States Attorney 

 First African American male (United States Attorney for the Western District of Washington): Nicholas W. Brown in 2021

Political Office 

 First Iranian American and blind male (Lieutenant Governor of Washington): Cyrus Habib in 2017

Washington State Bar Association 

 First African American male president: Ronald Ward from 2004-2005 
First openly gay male president: Anthony Gipe: 
First South Asian male president: Rajeev Majumdar in 2019

Firsts in local history 
 (Leonard) Carl Maxey (1951): First African American male lawyer in Eastern Washington
Jack Edward Tanner (1955): Considered "the first African American in the Pacific Northwest to be elevated to the federal bench"
Cameron Mitchell: First African American male to serve as a Judge of the Benton-Franklin Superior Court (2004)
Salvador Mendoza Jr. (1997): First Hispanic American male to serve as a Judge of the Benton-Franklin Superior Court (2013-2014)
John Edward Hawkins (1895): First African American male lawyer in King County, Washington
Warren Chan (1950): First Chinese American male lawyer in Seattle, Washington [King County, Washington]
Solie M. Ringold: First Jewish American male judge in Washington (1961)
Charles Z. Smith (1955): First African American male appointed as a municipal court judge in Seattle, Washington (1965)
Charles M. Stokes (c. 1943): First African American male to serve as a Judge of the King County District Court, Washington (1968)
 Mark Chow: First Asian American male elected as a district court judge in King County, Washington (1990)
 Ricardo S. Martinez (1980): First Latino American male to serve as a judge in King County, Washington (1990)
Gary Maehara: First Asian American male to serve as the President of the King County Bar Association, Washington (2005)
Dan Gandara: First Latino American male to serve as the President of the King County Bar Association, Washington (2008)
James Andrus: First African American male to serve as the President of the King County Bar Association, Washington (2009)
Eduardo Peñalver: First Latino American male to serve as the President of Seattle University School of Law (2021) [King County, Washington]
Nathan Sargeant: First African American male to serve as a Justice of the Peace in Kitsap County, Washington (1897)
Theodore "Ted" Spearman Jr.: First African American male judge in Kitsap County, Washington (2004)
Sergio Armijo: First Latino American male to serve as a Judge of the Pierce County Superior Court (1994)

See also 

 List of first minority male lawyers and judges in the United States

Other topics of interest 

 List of first women lawyers and judges in the United States
 List of first women lawyers and judges in Washington

References 

 
Minority, Washington, first
Minority, Washington, first
Legal history of Washington (state)
Lists of people from Washington (state)
Washington (state) lawyers